V. Philips Long, also known as Phil Long, is an American Old Testament scholar.

Long has degrees from Wheaton College, Gordon-Conwell Theological Seminary, and the University of Cambridge. He taught at Covenant Theological Seminary and the Freie Theologische Akademie in Germany before becoming Professor of Old Testament at Regent College.

Long served on the translation teams for the ESV and NLT. He is an ordained teaching elder in the Presbyterian Church in America.

Long specializes in study relating to the historicity of the Bible. According to C. Hassell Bullock, Long's 1994 book The Art of Biblical History "represents a long stride in the direction of open and honest grappling" with the issues of biblical history.

Works

Books

References

Living people
American biblical scholars
Old Testament scholars
Translators of the Bible into English
Presbyterian Church in America ministers
Wheaton College (Illinois) alumni
Gordon–Conwell Theological Seminary alumni
Alumni of the University of Cambridge
Covenant Theological Seminary faculty
Year of birth missing (living people)
Academic staff of Regent College